James Hughes Anderdon (1790–1879) was an English banker, slave owner and art collector. He is now known for his large-scale projects in extra-illustration.

Life
He was the second son of John Proctor Anderdon and his first wife Anne Oliver. He became a partner in Bosanquet Anderdon & Co., with James Whatman Bosanquet, Samuel Bosanquet III, and Charles Franks. After the Slavery Abolition Act 1833, he was paid compensation for the enslaved people on three estates in Nevis. He retired from the bank in 1843.

Collector
Anderdon collected paintings and drawings, engravings and autograph letters. He acquired English art at a sale in 1864 by Haskett Smith of Goudhurst (1813–1895), who was known for his "English School" collection. Anderdon bought works by John Crome, Richard Heighway and George Morland.

His collection of engravings after portrait paintings was largely acquired at the 1852 sale of the estate of Thomas Haviland Burke. In 1868 he gave to the Print Room of the British Museum Haviland Burke's collection of James Barry's engravings and drawings.

Legacy

Most of Anderdon's pictures were put up for sale after his death, in 1879. His collection of engraved portraits, mostly from the Haviland Burke sale, was left to Alexander Anderdon Weston, a cousin. Weston sold it in 1904.

Extra-illustration
Anderdon illustrated and annotated, in a form of "grangerisation", two distinct runs of past summer exhibition catalogues of the Royal Academy. These went to the British Museum, and to the library of the British Academy. Their significance includes the fact that the annotations preserve content from sources that are no longer extant. Materials added include letters from artists to John Taylor and Rudolph Ackermann. Anderdon's motivations for his compilations are thought to be in part pedagogic, for the needs of art students.

The first catalogue set, dates from 1769 to 1849 bound in 13 volumes, went to the British Museum, with a set of catalogues of the Society of Artists of Great Britain, dates from 1760 to 1791 in nine volumes.

The second catalogue set—which went to the Royal Academy—was based round the run of exhibition catalogues collected by the printmaker Edward Bell. Bell himself, it is thought, had already worked up an index to them.

In 1833 Anderdon bought from Gérard Jacob-Kolb (:fr:Gérard Jacob-Kolb) a 38-volume extra-illustrated compilation of 1823, based on the Biographie universelle, ancienne et moderne and other sources. Anderdon then developed it under the name of Collectanea Biographica, over most of the rest of his life, binding it in 1853 in 105 volumes. He left it to his half-sister Emma Mary, widow of Thomas Campbell Robertson, reportedly in 150 volumes. Her executors sold it in 1881 for a nominal price to the British Museum, where it is kept in the Keeper's Office of the Print Room.

A further work of extra-illustration was based on the Anecdotes of painters who have resided or been born on England (1808) of Edward Edwards, itself a supplement to a work by Horace Walpole. Again, it went to the British Museum.

Notes

1790 births
1879 deaths
English bankers
English art collectors
British slave owners